Vimal Jyothi Institute of Management and Research, Chemperi is a private, unaided, Catholic-Minority MBA college in Kerala, India. 

The Vimal Jyothi Institute of Management and Research offers two-year full-time residential MBA courses in Business Management.

Management 
The Institutions are run under Catholic Management with minority rights, established in 2010. The college is managed by The MESHAR Diocesan Educational Trust, Archbishop's House, Thalassery, approved by AICTE and affiliated with Kannur University.

Academics 

Vimal Jyothi MBA college offers dual specialization MBA degrees.

Specializations offered 
2 years of full-time MBA with dual specialization in
 Marketing Management
 Human Resource Management
 Financial Management

Admissions
MBA admission to Vimal Jyothi Institute of Management and Research (VJIM) are on a merit basis. Candidates can attend the pre-admission process. Final admission is confirmed as per the directions of the Admission Supervisory Committee and Fee Regulatory Committee.

MBA admission is based on scores of the valid Entrance Examination, Group Discussion and Personal Interview with weights of 80:10:10, respectively. Rank list is published.

KarmAnta 

KarmAnta is the management fest organized by the students of VJIM that provides participants a showcase for their management skills.

Rural Camp: GramaDharsan 

Rural camps are conducted with name Gramadharsan which is organized to get a real-time experience of the villages, their life styles, issues and concerns. It is a one week full-time residential program aimed to inculcate the value based awareness of the underprivileged society, imbibe the professional grooming and social commitments, personality grooming and social living.

Engineering college

Vimal Jyothi Engineering College is an educational project of the Archdiocese of Thallassery established in 2002, managed by Meshar Diocesan Educational Trust. The college is approved by AICTE and affiliated to APJ Abdul Kalam Technological University. It is an unaided, Catholic minority institution. It is the sister school of VJIM. It offers 4-year full-time BTech courses in 6 streams and 2-year full-time MTech post-graduate programmes in six departments.

4-year Full-time BTech Courses

 B.Tech in Electronics and Communication Engineering (ECE)
 B.Tech in Applied Electronics and Instrumentation Engineering (AEI)
 B.Tech in Computer Science and Engineering (CSE)
 B.Tech in Electrical and Electronics Engineering (EEE)
 B.Tech in Civil Engineering (CE)
 B.Tech in Mechanical Engineering (ME)

2-year Full-time Post Graduate Courses
 
 M.Tech in Structural Engineering and Construction Management
 M.Tech in Computer Science and Engineering
 M.Tech in Control and Instrumentation Engineering
 M.Tech in Communication Engineering and Signal Processing
 M.Tech in Thermal Engineering

References

Catholic universities and colleges in India
Private engineering colleges in Kerala
Colleges affiliated to Kannur University
Universities and colleges in Kannur district
Educational institutions established in 2002
2002 establishments in Kerala
Educational institutions established in 2010
2010 establishments in Kerala
Taliparamba